Russell H. "Russ" Edmonds (born October 11, 1961) is an American Disney animator who has worked as a character animator, an animator, a supervising animator, a lead animator and a final line animator at Walt Disney Animation Studios. He worked on several Disney feature films, including Oliver & Company, The Little Mermaid, The Rescuers Down Under, Beauty and the Beast, Aladdin, The Lion King, The Hunchback of Notre Dame, Tarzan, Atlantis: The Lost Empire, Home on the Range, The Princess and the Frog, and Winnie the Pooh. He studied at the Program in Character Animation at the California Institute of the Arts. Along with his wife, Angela, Edmonds owns and directs the Edmonds Studios, an independent animation production studio in Red Bluff, California.

Earlier career opportunities include development of isometric for Three Mile Island Nuclear Power Plant. (1st hand)

Filmography

Awards
Edmonds was nominated for the 1996 Annie Award for "Outstanding Individual Achievement for Animation" as the supervising animator of Phoebus in Disney's The Hunchback of Notre Dame.

References
Beck, Jerry, The Animated Movie Guide, Chicago Review Press, 2005, 348pp, 
Hill, Sally M.'Atlantis' animator visits Houston, The Daily Cougar, University of Houston, July 27, 2001
''Pair of Disney artists to exhibit 'Ranch Art''' Redding Record,Scripps Interactive Newspapers January 13, 2008

External links
Edmonds Studios animation website

Living people
American animators
California Institute of the Arts alumni
Place of birth missing (living people)
Walt Disney Animation Studios people
American storyboard artists
1961 births